The 38th Directors Guild of America Awards, honoring the outstanding directorial achievements in film and television in 1985, were presented on March 8, 1986 at the Beverly Hilton and the Plaza Hotel. The nominees in seven television categories were announced on January 23, 1986 and the feature film nominees were announced on January 29, 1986.

Winners and nominees

Film

Television

Commercials

D.W. Griffith Award
 Joseph L. Mankiewicz

Robert B. Aldrich Service Award
 George Sidney

References

External links
 

Directors Guild of America Awards
1985 film awards
1985 television awards
Direct
Direct
Directors
1986 in Los Angeles
1986 in New York City
March 1986 events in the United States